Gerasimos Anagnostou (born 1880, date of death unknown) was a Greek sports shooter. He competed in the 600 m free rifle event at the 1924 Summer Olympics.

References

External links
 

1880 births
Year of death missing
Greek male sport shooters
Olympic shooters of Greece
Shooters at the 1924 Summer Olympics
Sportspeople from Volos